TV Makes the Superstar is the lead and only single from Modern Talking's twelfth album, Universe, and also the band's last single-release.

Track listing 
CD-Maxi Hansa 82876 50814 2 (BMG) / EAN 0828765081429 03.03.2003
 "TV Makes The Superstar" (Radio Edit) - 3:44
 "TV Makes The Superstar" (Extended) - 5:05
 "TV Makes The Superstar" (Instrumental) - 3:44
 "Blackbird" - 3:17

Credits 
 Lead vocals: Thomas Anders
 Choir: Christoph Leisbendorff and William King
 Lyrics and music: Dieter Bohlen
 Keyboards: Thorsten Brötzmann, Jeo and Michael Knauer
 Guitars: Peter Weihe
 Mix: Jeo @Jeopark

Charts

References

External links

Songs about television
Modern Talking songs
2003 singles
Songs written by Dieter Bohlen
2003 songs